The 1987–88 Hong Kong First Division League season was the 77th since its establishment. Starting from this season, 3 points are awarded for a win in normal time. If a match ended in a draw after normal time, a penalty shootout would follow to determine the winner. The winner of the penalty shootout would be warded 2 points whereas the loser would receive 1 point.

League table

References
1987–88 Hong Kong First Division table (RSSSF)

Hong
Hong Kong First Division League seasons
1987–88 in Hong Kong football